The 1965 Football Championship of Ukrainian SSR (Class B) was the 35th season of association football competition of the Ukrainian SSR, which was part of the Ukrainian Class B. It was the fifteenth in the Soviet Class B and the third season of the Ukrainian Class B. 

The 1965 Football Championship of Ukrainian SSR (Class B) was won by SKA Lviv.

Location map

Zone 1 (Center)

Relegated teams
 none

Promoted teams
 none

Relocated and renamed teams
 FC Avanhard Kerch was last year known as FC Metalurh Kerch

Final standings

Zone 2 (West)

Relegated teams
 none

Promoted teams
 FC Avtomobilist Odesa

Relocated and renamed teams
 FC Dynamo-2 Kyiv replaced the team of Kyiv aviation plant, Temp Kyiv
 FC Bukovyna Chernivtsi was last year known as FC Avanhard Chernivtsi

Final standings

Zone 3 (Southeast)

Relegated teams
 none

Promoted teams
 FC Shakhtar Krasnyi Luch – (debut)
 FC Shakhtar Torez
 FC Shakhtar Yenakieve

Relocated and renamed teams
 FC Lokomotyv Kherson was last year known as FC Budivelnyk Kherson, being transferred to the local administration of Odesa Railways
 FC Spartak Melitopol was last year known as FC Burevisnyk Melitopol

Final standings

Second stage 
Belarusian teams did not participate in the second stage.

Places 1–6

Places 7–12

Places 13–18

Places 19–24

Places 25–30

Places 31–36

Places 37–42

Places 43–45

Promotion / relegation play-off 
Both games were played in Simferopol. Both teams were promoted.

See also
 Soviet Second League

External links
 1965 season regulations.  Luhansk football portal
 1965 Soviet championships (all leagues) at helmsoccer.narod.ru

1965
3
Soviet
Soviet
class B
1965 in Moldovan football
1965 in Belarusian football
Football Championship of the Ukrainian SSR